Alphonsus Joseph "Alphie" McCourt (29 July 1940 – 2 July 2016) was an Irish-American writer. He was the youngest brother of Frank McCourt.

Early life
Alphie McCourt was born in Limerick, Ireland on 29 July 1940, the youngest son of Malachy McCourt (1901–1985) and Angela Sheehan (1908–1981).

Writing
Following in the footsteps of his elder brothers Frank McCourt and Malachy McCourt, Alphie had his own memoir A Long Stone's Throw published in 2008. The book was well received. He had published articles in The Washington Post, The Villager and The Limerick Leader prior to writing his memoir.

Death
He died on 29 July 2016, 27 days before his 76th birthday. His brother Michael died in September, 9 months earlier, and he was survived by his brother Malachy.

References

1940 births
2016 deaths
Writers from Limerick (city)
Irish emigrants to the United States
Irish autobiographers
Irish memoirists
Writers from New York City
United States Army soldiers